Taolu is a village in Hopang District, Wa Self-Administered Division of Myanmar.

Geography
Taolu is located in the mountainous area near the border with China, which lies 3 km east of the village. Mong Ling Shan mountain rises about 8 km to the north.

See also
Wa States

References

External links
The border area (Wa region)

Populated places in Shan State
China–Myanmar border
Wa people